Breda Dennehy-Willis (born 3 February 1970) is an Irish long-distance runner. She competed in the women's 5000 metres at the 2000 Summer Olympics.

Her daughter, Roisin Willis, u20 World Champion 800 meters 1:59.13 Gold medal relay 4x400 meters was an American based High School athlete who qualified for the 2021 US Olympic trials in the 800m.

References

External links
 

1970 births
Living people
Athletes (track and field) at the 2000 Summer Olympics
Irish female long-distance runners
Olympic athletes of Ireland
Place of birth missing (living people)